Bude is a seaside town in Cornwall, England,

Bude may also refer to:
Bude, Mississippi, United States
Guillaume Budé (1467–1540), a French scholar
Bude-Light, an oil lamp named after the English town
Bude Canal
Bude railway station